Trikkalangode is a large Grama Panchayath located in Ernad (Manjeri) Taluk of Malappuram district in Kerala state with total 10415 families residing. The Trikkalangode Grama Panchayath has population of 52090 of which 25140 are males while 26950 are females as per Population Census 2011.
In Trikkalangode village population of children with age 0-6 is 7266. Average Sex Ratio of Trikkalangode is 1046 which is lower than Kerala state average of 1084. Child Sex Ratio for the Trikkalangode as per census is 927, lower than Kerala average of 964.

Trikkalangode has higher literacy rate compared to Kerala. In 2011, literacy rate of Trikkalangode   was 94.58% compared to 94.00% of Kerala. In Trikkalangode Male literacy stands at 96.57% while female literacy rate was 92.72%.

As per constitution of India and Panchyati Raaj Act, Trikkalangode is administrated by Sarpanch (Head of Village) who is elected representative of village. Our website, don't have information about schools and hospital in Trikkalangode village.

Demographics
 India census, Trikkalangode had a population of 52090.

Transportation
Trakalangod village connects to other parts of India through Manjeri town (just ).  National highway No.66 passes through Parappanangadi - Gudellur and the northern stretch connects to Goa and Mumbai.  The southern stretch connects to Cochin and Trivandrum.   National Highway No.966 connects to Palakkad and Coimbatore.  The nearest airport is at Kozhikode.  The nearest major railway station is at Tirur.

References

Villages in Malappuram district
Manjeri